Amber Holland (born July 10, 1974) is a Canadian curler from Loreburn, Saskatchewan.  Holland skipped Saskatchewan's team to a national women's championship in 2011 by defeating defending champion Jennifer Jones in the Scotties Tournament of Hearts and won a silver medal at the 2011 Capital One World Women's Curling Championship.  She also won a national championship at the junior level in 1992, and captured a silver medal at the World Junior Curling Championships in 1993 after losing in the final.

Curling career

1992–2010
Holland's first experience curling at the national level came at the 1992 Canadian Junior Curling Championships in Vernon, British Columbia, where she skipped her Saskatchewan team to a national championship.  Her teammates at the event included Angela Street, Tracy Beach and Cindy Street.  Holland and her rink represented Canada at the 1993 World Junior Curling Championships, where they captured the silver medal.

After beginning play on the women's circuit after her junior career was finished in 1993, Holland did not have immediate success.  She has played in Saskatchewan's provincial playdowns ten times, but did not appear at the Scotties Tournament of Hearts until 1999, when she served as an alternate for her former junior teammate Cindy Street.  She also served as an alternate for Tracy Streifel's team at the 2006 event.  Holland competed in Canada's Olympic curling trials in 2001 and 2005.  She skipped her own entry in 2001, and played as an alternate with Sherry Anderson's rink in 2005.

Holland's 2011 championship rink of third Kim Schneider, second (and Kim's sister) Tammy Schneider and lead Heather Kalenchuk got together in 2005. In 2008 they won the World Curling Tour Players' Championships.  The team was coached by Merv Fonger and the alternate was Jolene Campbell.

2010–2012
On January 10, 2010, Holland advanced to her first Scotties Tournament of Hearts as a skip by defeating Sherry Anderson 9-6 in the final of the Saskatchewan championship in Eston. Skipping team Saskatchewan, Holland's rink finished the 2010 Scotties Tournament of Hearts with a 6-5 record, out of the playoffs.  Holland captured the Ford Hot Shot skills competition at the 2010 tournament, defeating Ontario lead Kari MacLean to win a two-year lease on a 2010 Ford Taurus.

Holland and her rink again represented Saskatchewan at the 2011 Scotties Tournament of Hearts.  They started the round robin portion of the tournament with an eight-game winning streak, and finished in first place overall.  Holland played defending champion Jennifer Jones in the final.  The final was tied at seven heading into the final end.  Holland stole a single point to win after Jones missed her final shot.  After the tournament, Holland was awarded the Sandra Schmirler Most Valuable Player Award.  Sandra Schmirler skipped the last team from Saskatchewan that won the national championship in 1997. At the 2012 Scotties Tournament of Hearts, Holland and her team would have a difficult time, finishing round robin with a 6-5 record. They would not make the playoffs, marking the first time since 2008 Team Canada would not be in the playoffs.

After seven years of playing with her Canadian Championship winning team, Holland announced that she would leave her squad (Kim Schneider, Tammy Schneider, Heather Kalenchuk). Holland told her team she wanted to go in another direction. Kalenchuk decided to step away from the game for a few years. Kim Schneider moved to play with Deanna Doig, and Tammy Schneider did not curl competitively during the 2012-13 season. This split left the four players ineligible for $72,000 worth of federal funding earned from winning the 2011 Scotties Tournament of Hearts, and they will forfeit their spot earned in the 2013 Olympic Curling Pre-Trials.

2012–2014
For the 2012/2013 curling season, Holland formed a new team consisting of longtime alternate Jolene Campbell at third, Brooklyn Lemon at second, and Dailene Sivertson, who previously played for Kelly Scott, at lead. Holland's new lineup finished 3rd at the 2013 Saskatchewan Scotties Tournament of Hearts and did not advance to the final 8 in any of the 4 Grand Slam events entered. Their best World Curling Tour event was 3rd place at the 2013 Pomeroy Inn & Suites Prairie Showdown. Following the season, the team made a minor lineup change, with Lemon and Sivertson switching places.

In the 2013–14 curling season, the team played in the 2013 Canadian Olympic Curling Pre-Trials, where they lost all three of their matches. They played in three slams in the season, missing the playoffs in all three events. At the 2014 Saskatchewan Scotties Tournament of Hearts, Holland led her rink to a 3–2 round robin record, but lost in their second tiebreaker match.

2014–2015
Holland began the 2014–15 curling season with a new lineup of Cathy Overton-Clapham, Sasha Carter and Chelsey Matson. The team played in three Slams that year, making it to the semifinals at the 2014 Curlers Corner Autumn Gold Curling Classic.

2017–2020
Holland did not return to competitive curling until 2017, with a new team consisting of Sherri Singler, Laura Strong and Debbie Lozinski. In their first season together, the team played in the 2018 Saskatchewan Scotties Tournament of Hearts, going 2–6. In 2018, the team added Cindy Ricci at third, replacing Singler. The team fared much better at the 2019 Saskatchewan Scotties Tournament of Hearts, going 5–3 in the round robin, before losing in the 3 vs. 4 game to Kristen Streifel. In the 2019–20 curling season, the team played in two Slams. At the 2020 Saskatchewan Scotties Tournament of Hearts, the team were knocked out in the C event after winning just two games.

2020–present
In 2020, Kim Schneider re-joined the Holland rink at third, and Karlee Korchinski replaced Strong at second. There were no provincials in 2021 due to the COVID-19 pandemic, however Holland was invited to join the Saskatchewan team at the 2021 Scotties Tournament of Hearts. The team, which was skipped by Sherry Anderson finished with a 6–6 record. The following year, Team Holland won the 2021 DeKalb Superspiel. At the 2022 Saskatchewan Scotties Tournament of Hearts, the team made the playoffs, where they won the C1 vs C2 game before losing in the semifinal to the eventual winner, Penny Barker. The Barker rink invited Holland to be the team's alternate at the 2022 Scotties Tournament of Hearts, where they finished with a 4–4 record. At the end of the season, Team Holland played in the 2022 Champions Cup, where they failed to make the playoffs.

Teams

Personal life
Holland started curling when she was 11.  She served as the technical director for the Saskatchewan Curling Association from 1997 to 2009.  In 2009, she was appointed executive director of the organization. She currently works as an administration and marketing manager for Harbor Golf Club.

Grand Slam record

Former events

References

External links

 Team Website
 Official Twitter Page

1974 births
Canadian women curlers
Canadian women's curling champions
Living people
Curlers from Saskatchewan
Sportspeople from Yorkton
Canada Cup (curling) participants